Jörg Hubert Meuthen (born 29 June 1961) is a German economist serving as a member of the European Parliament for the Centre Party. He was the leading candidate of the Alternative for Germany (AfD) for the 2019 European Parliament election. He served as federal spokesman for, and thus leader of, the AfD from July 2015 until his resignation in January 2022, caused by conflict with right-wing extremist elements in the party. He was frontrunner for the AfD at the 2016 Baden-Württemberg state election and was a Member of Parliament and parliamentary leader from March 2016.

Life 
Meuthen is a professor of political economy and finance at the Academy of Kehl. Initially close to the Free Democratic Party of Germany (FDP), he joined the AfD because of its eurosceptic positions. He strongly defends economic liberalism. He also adopts national-conservative positions and a rhetoric considered xenophobic against migrants and Muslims. He is married to the Russian-born Natalia Zvekic, whose ex-husband came from Yugoslavia.

He was leader of the AfD in the 2016 regional elections in Baden-Württemberg and has been a member of parliament and parliamentary leader since March 2016. In November 2017, he joined the European Parliament following the resignation of Beatrix von Storch. Re-elected MEP in May 2019, he is a member of the parliamentary group Identity and Democracy (ID). While he maintains that "the AfD must be a bourgeois party with a bourgeois reason and endowed with an appearance of seriousness," he was strongly challenged in 2020 by the wing (Der Flügel) of the party. Meuthen had had one of the wing’s leaders (Björn Höcke) excluded because of his neo-Nazi past.  This provoked a split within the party.  Meuthen was accused by his internal opponents of wanting to polish the image of the AfD, of asserting his personal ambitions to obtain the top candidate position on the list (and therefore of candidate for the chancellorship of the AfD for the Bundestag elections). He was booed at the party congress in November 2020.  A motion of no confidence received 47 per cent of the votes.

In September 2019, the regional film fund  fired its CEO Hans Joachim Mendig over a controversial meeting with Jörg Meuthen.

Meuthen announced in October 2021 that he would not be running in the next leadership election.  In January 2022, he announced that he would step down from his official positions and leave the AfD, because the party had moved too far to the right.

Political views
Meuthen was initially considered part of the Bernd Lucke-related, more economically liberal and moderate wing of the AfD near the start of the party's founding. He has described himself as an economic liberal but "pretty conservative" on other issues. Following the election of Frauke Petry as AfD chairwoman, Meuthen was seen to ally himself with the party's more right-wing faction. In 2016, he expressed support for what he termed a "conservative reformation" in Germany and argued against what he regards as lingering influence of the West German student movement on German politics. He has expressed opposition to extremist elements within the AfD.

European Union
In 2015, Meuthen stated he was not a "Europe hater" but opposed the Eurozone, claiming the Euro currency had "perverted" European unity. In 2019, he argued that the European People's Party had moved too far to the left and criticized the EPP's decision to expel Viktor Orban's Fidesz party.

Immigration
Meuthen has expressed opposition to the immigration and asylum policies under Angela Merkel. During an AfD party conference in 2016, he stated "We are opposed to allowing immigration in such large numbers with open eyes that we will no longer recognize our own country in just a few years. The leading culture in Germany is not Islam, but the Christian - occidental culture. The call of the muezzin cannot claim to be as self-evident as the Christian ringing of church bells."

Meuthen has argued that asylum seekers should be granted temporary resident permits as opposed to full citizenship and permeant residency.

During the COVID-19 pandemic in Germany, Meuthen stated that Germany should suspend its membership of the Schengen agreement, arguing that open borders were contributing to the spread of the virus.

Foreign policy
Meuthen has expressed support for Israel and has called on the German government to ban the Lebanese-based militant group Hezbollah.

Resignation 
On January 28, 2022, Meuthen declared that he would resign from the party chairmanship with immediate effect and resign from the AfD.

He justified this with the fact that he had lost the power struggle with the formally dissolved right-wing extremist "Der Flügel" ("the wing") over the political direction of AfD. Meuthen criticized that the party had developed far to the right and was in large parts no longer concurrent with the liberal democratic basic order in Germany. In June 2022 he joined the Centre Party.

References

1961 births
Living people
Politicians from Essen
Alternative for Germany politicians
Leaders of political parties in Germany
Members of the Landtag of Baden-Württemberg
Monetary economists
MEPs for Germany 2014–2019
MEPs for Germany 2019–2024